The Roman Catholic Diocese of Bhagalpur is a diocese located in the city of Bhagalpur in the Ecclesiastical province of Patna in India.

History
Christian presence from 1779 has been documented. The early Christians were mainly indigo planters, railwaymen and their dependents. They did have a few handful of natives.

During the Capuchin Period (1779-1919), Bhagalpur was at first the part of Prefecture of Tibet-Hindustan erected by the Sacred Congregation of the Evangelisation of the Peoples in 1703. It became a resident station in 1783.

The Jesuit Period (1919-1983): The Patna Jesuits started working here since 1921. Their missionary efforts were directed mainly among the Santhals.

On 3 August 1956, Bhagalpur was detached from the Patna Diocese and the Prefecture Apostic was established. Msgr. Urban McGarry tor, was appointed the Prefect Apostolic.

It was promoted as Diocese of Bhagalpur on 11 January 1965. Most Rev Urban Eugene McGarry tor was appointed as its first Bishop. The diocese comprised the districts of Bhagalpur, Banka, Jamui and the civil blocks of lakshmipur, Kharagpur and Tarapur of Mnger district of Bihar, Godda, Giridih, Deoghar and Sarawan of Deoghar district and Mandro block of Sahebgunj district of Jharkhand.

Jharkhand controversies 
In July 2018, Sister Konsalia Balsa and charity worker Anima Indwar, who both served in the local Missionaries of Charity chapter, were arrested for selling a baby in Jharkhand they put up for adoption through Missionaries of Charity for $1750. Catholic property in Jharkhand falls under the jurisdiction of the Diocese of Bhagalpur.

On September 10, 2019, Crux reported that Father Benoy John and catechist Munna Hansda were part of an effort to forcibly convert locals in Jharkhand and were arrested on charges of forced conversion on September 6, 2019. Father Arun Vincent was also suspected of working with John and Hansda, but was not formally arrested and later released. Both John and Hansda were also revealed to have illegally occupying land to

Leadership
 Bishops of Bhagalpur (Latin Rite)
 Bishop Kurian (Ciriaco) Valiakandathil (11 January 2007 – present)

 Bishop Thomas Kozhimala (14 June 1996 – 1 June 2005)

 Bishop George Victor Saupin, S.J. (30 November 1987 – 2 August 1993)
 Bishop Urban Eugen McGarry, T.O.R. (11 January 1965 – 30 November 1987)
 Prefects Apostolic of Bhagalpur (Latin Rite) 
 Fr. Urban Eugen McGarry, T.O.R. (later Bishop) (1956 – 11 January 1965)

Seminary

This seminary at Bhagalpur, Sahibgunj is the training center for the first two years of priesthood. A hostel is attached to the seminary where students live. To the right is the hostel and to the left is the seminary.

Hospitals 
There are 42 hospitals run by the Diocese of Bhagalpur.

Punaruthanam Ashram at Sahebgunj is working for the Psychiatric patients of Bhagalpur

Schools 

There are more than 70 schools run by the Diocese of Bhagalpur. The most well known are St Joseph's School, Bhagalpur - Bhagalpur, Mount Assisi School - Bhagalpur, Mount Carmel School - Bhagalpur, St. Joseph's School - Kahalgaon, St. Teresa School - Bhagalpur, C.M.S. School - Bhagalpur, St. Paul's School Bhagalpur.

The list of Schools is given here:

Hostels 
List of Boys hostels run by the Diocese of Bhagalpur

List of Girls hostels run by the Diocese of Bhagalpur

Social Initiatives
The Diocese of Bhagalpur has been involved in helping people around Bhagalpur in all the districts that it operates. They provide flood relief material and are able to mobilize resources and money for the charity work during local disasters (Mainly flood)

The Diocese of Bhagalpur has attempted to bring good understanding between various religions. All schools of the Diocese cater to every religion and sect. There is special provision for the needy in most of the schools.

Dialogue Between Religious leaders
Dialogues between religious leaders are often conducted by the Diocese.

References

Roman Catholic dioceses in India
Christian organizations established in 1956
Christianity in Bihar
Bhagalpur
Roman Catholic dioceses and prelatures established in the 20th century
1956 establishments in Bihar